A34 or A-34 may refer to:

Roads
 A34 autoroute (France), connecting Sedan and Reims
 A34 highway (Sri Lanka), connecting Mankulam and Mullaitivu
 A34 road (England), connecting Winchester, Hampshire to Salford
 A34 road (Isle of Man), connecting Ballasalla and the A3
 

 A34 (Sydney), Australia

Other uses
 Aero A.34, a Czech touring plane of the 1930s
 Brewster A-34 Bermuda, USAAF designation for lend-lease SB2As dive bombers built for the British
 HLA-A34, a human serotype
 Painter of Berlin A 34, a vase painter during the pioneering period of Attic black-figure vase painting
 A-34 Comet (tank), a British tank used in World War II
 An Encyclopaedia of Chess Openings code for the English Opening in chess
 Samsung Galaxy A34 5G, an Android smartphone by Samsung Electronics